Anushirvan ibn Khalid ibn Muhammad Kashani, also known as Abu Nasr Sharaf al-Din, was a Persian statesman and historian, who served as the vizier of the Seljuq Empire and the Abbasid Caliphate.

Anushirvan was born in 1066/7 at Ray; he belonged to a Twelver Shia family which had origins in Kashan. He was a treasurer and head of the Seljuq military during the reign of Sultan Muhammad I. Anushirvan was later succeeded by  Shams al-Mulk Uthman as head of the Seljuq military. After this, Anushirvan went to Baghdad, where he later became head of the Seljuq military once again. He was shortly appointed by Mahmud II as his vizier in 1127, and remained in that office until 1128. Anushirvan served as the vizier of the Abbasid caliph al-Mustarshid from 1132 to 1134, and then briefly as the vizier of the new Seljuq Sultan Ghiyath ad-Din Mas'ud from 1135 to 1136. Anushirvan later died between 1137 and 1139.

Sources

External links
 

11th-century Iranian historians
12th-century Iranian historians
1130s deaths
1060s births
Viziers of the Seljuk Empire
Viziers of the Abbasid Caliphate
People from Ray, Iran